The governor of the Department Santander heads the executive branch of the government of the Colombian department of Santander. The governor is the highest-ranking official in the department, serving as the main agent for the president of Colombia to carry on the task of maintaining public order and the execution of the general economic policy, and all matters of law passed down for the nation. The current governor is Horacio Serpa Uribe.

Presidents of the Sovereign State of Santander
The Sovereign State of Santander was created on May 13, 1857 as the third Sovereign State of the Republic of New Granada. The state would be an independent entity within the country ruled by a president which would be elected by the State Congress. The president of the state would act as the governor of the region but with more power and independence from the central government, in turn, the title of governor was given to the heads of government of the provinces of the state.

Many presidents of the state, due to the great amount of power they held, and the political importance of the region, went on to become Presidents of the Nation, and others went on to become important political figures in Congress or other areas.

On April 8, 1859, Congress passed a law giving the president of the country, then the Granadine Confederation, the right to remove the duly appointed governors of the states and appoint one of his choosing. With this law, the president secured the power of the Conservative Party. This changed the practice of a state-elected executive representative; instead the president of Colombia would appoint the president or governor of the state or department; this went on till 1991.

Governors of the Department of Santander

In 1886 the states were abolished and Santander became a Department under direct
authority of the central government.

In 1910 the northern part of the department was detached to form the new Department of Norte de Santander separately represented by their own Governor.

Democratically elected governors

The Colombian Constitution of 1991 allowed for local democratic elections to take place electing governors for each department and the elections being held at the same time to avoid confusion.

See also
 List of governors of Norte de Santander Department
 List of presidents of Colombia

References